Alitalia Flight 4128 was a scheduled flight from Leonardo da Vinci Airport, in Rome, Italy, to Palermo International Airport in Palermo, Italy, with 129 on board. The accident was attributed to the flight deck crew believing they were nearer to the runway than they were, and therefore making a premature descent. The crew then stopped the descent at 150 feet above the sea, as though trying to locate the final approach area, thinking they were close to the runway because of the airport lights. It is the second-deadliest air crash in Alitalia's history behind Alitalia Flight 112 which had crashed 6 years prior.

References

External links
 JetPhotos.Net – I-DIKQ
  Gli Atti Parlamentari dell'I-DIKQ
 CVR transcript

Aviation accidents and incidents in Italy
Airliner accidents and incidents caused by pilot error
Disasters in Sicily
Aviation accidents and incidents in 1978
1978 in Italy
4128
Accidents and incidents involving the McDonnell Douglas DC-9
December 1978 events in Europe
Man-made disasters in Italy
1978 disasters in Italy